Ursus Vodka is a vodka of Icelandic origin that was made in Hoorn, Netherlands until 2006.

The recipe was developed by a traditional Icelandic distiller family in the early twentieth century. Since 1995 it was distilled and bottled by Distillery De Hoorn BV in Hoorn in the Netherlands. Ursus Vodka was distributed by Ursus Vodka Company NV. In 2004 the brand Ursus was taken over by Diageo, where it is produced today.

Besides Ursus Vodka, Distillery De Hoorn BV produced Ursus Roter, Ursus Lemon and Ursus Blackcurrant.

In  Ursus was the main sponsor of the Pacific Formula One team, and the brand continued its sponsorship into .

Dutch vodkas
Icelandic vodkas